The Pretzel Amusement Ride Company was an amusement ride manufacturer that produced a variety of rides, including an early dark ride known as The Pretzel, the company's namesake. It built over 1400 rides for carnivals and amusement parks.

Name
The company took its name from its trademark dark ride, The Pretzel, so called because of its track's winding, pretzel-like layout. It may also have been influenced by the comment of someone who rode the ride's prototype: "It felt like I was turned and twisted like a pretzel".

History
The company was established in 1928 when founders Marvin Rempfer and Leon Cassidy patented a single-rail dark ride they built in Tumbling Dam Park on the banks of Sunset Lake in Bridgeton, New Jersey. The company remained in Bridgeton throughout its existence.

A large heavy pretzel design was originally affixed to the front of each car to prevent it from flipping backwards. In 1929, a standard Pretzel ride had five cars, 350 feet of track, a riding time of one and a half minutes, and sold for $1,200.

Portable pretzel rides for carnivals weighed about 9 tons. They were transported on huge moving vans. For the first three decades, Pretzel rides were single story. Beginning in the 1950s, two-story "double decker" rides were also made whose cars were hoisted to the second story by a lift chain during the ride. Leon Cassidy was not in favor of the double-decker version. The Mad Giant was 17 tons, 40'x 8' on trailer, and 70'x30' when opened, and took about five hours to set up. Pretzel also made spinning rides, including a famous one for Coney Island.

Leon's son William Cassidy ran the company after his father. He sold the rights to build the rides in 1979.

List of rides
Pretzel rides were usually themed. They included The Caveman, Haunted House, Lost Mine, Gold Nugget, Thunderbird Jr. Ride, Toonerville Trolley, Whirlo, Kiddie Circus, Devil's Cave/Pirate's Cove/Bucket O' Blood (the same ride rethemed), Devils Inn, Winter Wonderland, Orient Express, Mad Giant, Laff in the Dark, Laff in the Dark with spinning cars, Laffland, Pirates Cave, Pirates Den, Paris After Dark, Arabian Nights Tunnel of Love/Casper's Ghostland, Treasure Island, Spook-A-Rama, Le Cachot/Safari/Zoomerang, and three versions of Dante's Inferno.

References

External links
 Send 'Em Out Laffing The History of the Pretzel Amusement Ride Company

Amusement ride manufacturers
Companies based in New Jersey